Arvi is a city and municipal council in Wardha district in the state of Maharashtra, India.

Geography 
It has an average elevation of 328 metres (1075 feet). Arvi is an important centre for the cotton and soybean trade. The closest airport from Arvi is Nagpur Airport situated at 100 kilometres and the closest Railway Station From Arvi is Pulgoan Junction situated at 35 kilometres.The location of Arvi is on Ravandev Garmasur Plateau, which is also a reason for the growth of long thread bearing cotton. Wardha river and Bakli river flowing alongside the borders of Arvi taluka are the main source of water for the villages.

Arvi is also called the City of Saints. Saint Maybai, Saint Pandurang Maharaj, Saint Lahanuji Maharaj(Takarkheda) are the prominent ones having their own followers spread across the Vidarbha region.

Demographics 
 India census, Arvi had a population of 42,822: 21,956 males (51%) and 20,864 females (49%). There are 5,836 members of Scheduled Castes and 2,123 of Scheduled Tribes. Arvi has a literacy rate of 90.6%, higher than the national average. Many educationist has contributed to this literacy rate and Arvi follows the progressive thinking for which Maharashtra is known for in India. Krishak Education Society and Bharat education society has its network of Schools and colleges in Arvi taluka along with historical Gandhi Vidyalaya,Model High school , Z.P.Girls highschool , Kannamwar High school, Tapasya and Vidyaniketan English School are providing quality education. Arvi has a library containing more than 1 lac books i.e. 'Lokamanya Vachnalaya'. Which is one of the centers carrying out cultural and social activities like wise conferences, talks of eminent personalities in various field and domains.

Below data is for Taluka.

History
Arvi is also known for its British time rail "Shakuntla Express", which is one of the longest surviving narrow gauge rail line in India. British had built it for the purpose of transport and thereby export cotton to Manchester City in England.

Arvi ghee (clarified butter) especially that obtained from the local cow breed Gaolao is famous in Vidarbha region and is sold across region.
There is lake named "Sarangpuri" created by Britishers in 1907 AD. The specialty of this is that the water is supplied to entire town without motor by the mechanism of gravitational force, the water has high purified quality. Sarangpuri now is a small animal sanctuary where thousands of birds and animals including tiger and leopard reside. Nowadays Water is supplied through Newly Constructed Lower Wardha Dam backwaters from Kaundanyapur (Kundinpur) which is also recreation center for the People here. Kaundanyapur has reference from Mahabharat in which Rukmini Haran was done by Lord Krishna from Ambika Temple located at Kundinpur which is now known as Kaundanyapur. Still this place has Ambika temple where big celebration happens during Navratris. Many devotees come during this period here.
Kundinpur was also the capital of vidharbh state at mahabharata time. Rani Damayanti (wife of raja Nal) was also from kundinpur.  That's why the name of upper wardha dam is kept as" Nal Damayanti" sagar. Kaundanyapur also has an ancient Digambar Jain Temple dedicated to Tirthankar Suparshvanath.

Kaundinyapur is also known as Pandharpur of Vidarbha. Vitthala Temple on the banks of Wardha river hosts Kartik and Aashadi Ekadashi pilgrimage when people from all over region come for prayer. During this period, a big fair popularly known as Yatra/Jatra happen.
Khairwada village near to Arvi has the largest group of Megalithic Circles and burials, numbering almost 1200–1400, belonging to the Stone and Iron Ages and around 10,000 years old as per the excavations conducted time to time by Archaeology Department.

Arvi Municipality was established in 1865 A.D. Arvi Railway station is as the same during the British rule.
Arvi is also known as sant bhumi (Land of saints). Sant Lahanuji maharaj was from village Takarkhed 10 km west of arvi. Sant Bhanudas maharaj opened the school for blinds in village Vardh Maneri 5 km in north from Arvi. Saint Maybai, Saint Jhamsingh Maharaj, Saint Nirmalabai Joshi, Pandurang Maharaj, Saint Sarubai, Telangrai Maharaj, Adkuji Maharaj, Tatyaji Maharaj, Baba Maharaj Arvikar, Henduji Maharaj, etc. have close ties with the land of Arvi.

Many freedom-fighters from around Arvi have contributed during the Indian Freedom Movement. Big leaders like Tukdoji Maharaj and other political and Historic personalities have delivered speeches and led the people of Arvi for better cause.

Red Cross Society, Rotary and Lions Club, Madat Foundation, Pranimitra and Paryavaran Bachav Samiti and other social organisations have been continuously working for the cause of social work in Arvi.

Arvi's Telangrai Maharaj Samadhi is a unique blend of Hindu-Muslim unity. The Kachwala Digambar Jain Mandir is almost 300 years old and houses a very distinct style of glass and mural paintings. The newly constructed Shwetambar Jain Temple is a attraction for art and architecture lovers. Ghode Ka Mandir is also a special attraction here.

Arvi Nagar Parishad and Lokmanya Vachnalaya built in 1865, Gandhi Vidyalaya, British Park( now Atal Bihari Garden) are some of the best specimens of British Gothic built infrastructures. Recently, The new Nagar Parishad building has been made which looks like Vidhan Bhawan.

Languages

Residents of arvi communicate in Marathi language.  Apart from the commonly used Varhadi, a dialect of Marathi language used in the district .Hindi and English are also spoken in the region.

Politics
For Maharashtra Assembly - Many years Indian National congress (INC) ruled over here. Current MLA is Dadaraoji Keche of BJP. Previous term was completed by 
Shri. Amar Kale from INC.

References

External links 
 https://web.archive.org/web/20110830121115/http://taluka.lokmat.com/attachments/ARV_Pg1.pdf
 https://web.archive.org/web/20110830121231/http://taluka.lokmat.com/attachments/ARV_Pg3.pdf

Cities and towns in Wardha district
Talukas in Maharashtra